Starfish and Coffee were an American pop/rock band from Atlanta, Georgia.  Their name comes from a song written by Prince and Susannah Melvoin on Prince's 1987 double album Sign o' the Times.

History
Ross Childress was the original lead guitarist for the rock band Collective Soul from 1994 to 2001. Following his departure from Collective Soul, Childress collaborated with Econoline Crush frontman Trevor Hurst in a band simply titled Hurst. Hurst and Childress produced and wrote over 40 songs, with four of them appearing on the Hurst EP Wanderlust (2005); one of those tracks, "Not Broken," was later featured on Starfish and Coffee's self-titled album.

2006–07: The Ross Childress Experience and name change
In September 2006, Childress was asked to perform a charity concert in Atlanta by musician Andrew Adler of the local band The Hot Rods. Childress gave a noncommittal reply which Adler interpreted as a definite "yes" and was accidentally booked to perform as The Ross Childress Experience. Childress asked Bo Bentley (bass) and Thomas Michael (drums) to play with him, and the trio decided to form a band following the positive response of their gig at the charity concert. 
  
On May 25, 2007, the band performed their first concert under the name Starfish and Coffee at Smith's Olde Bar in Atlanta. This show also marked the live debut of guitarist Andrew Carter.

2008–09: Starfish and Coffee and disbandment
On April 29, 2008, Starfish and Coffee released their self-titled debut studio album. Their debut single was "Tragicomedy."
  
On November 22, 2008, Starfish and Coffee won the award for Top40 New Group of the Year at the New Music Awards in Hollywood, California.
  
Starfish and Coffee continued to perform live shows until 2009. Childress released his debut solo album, Music Box, the following year.

Band members
 Ross Childress – lead vocals, guitar (2006–09)
 Andrew Carter – lead guitar (2007–09)
 Bo Bentley – bass (2006–09)
 Thomas Michael – drums (2006–09)

Discography
 Starfish and Coffee (2008)

Awards and nominations

New Music Awards
The New Music Awards are given for excellence in music to both recording artists and radio stations by New Music Weekly magazine.

|-
| 2008
| Starfish and Coffee
| Top40 New Group of the Year
| 
|}

References

External links
 Starfish and Coffee on Myspace

2006 establishments in Georgia (U.S. state)
2009 disestablishments in Georgia (U.S. state)
American pop rock music groups
Musical groups disestablished in 2009
Musical groups established in 2006
Musical groups from Atlanta
American musical trios
Musical quartets
Rock music groups from Georgia (U.S. state)